Chloroethylclonidine is an irreversible agonist for adrenergic receptors, in particular alpha1B, D, C and alpha2A/D-subtypes.

References

Alpha-1 adrenergic receptor agonists
Alpha-2 adrenergic receptor agonists
Chloroethyl compounds
Imidazolines
Nitrogen mustards
Organochlorides